Arigo Padovan (born 16 June 1927) is an Italian retired professional road bicycle racer, who won stages in both the Tour de France and the Giro d'Italia.

Major results

1951
Gran Premio Industria e Commercio di Prato
Giro d'Italia:
8th place overall classification
1952
Bolzano - Trento
GP Industria in Belmonte-Piceno
1955
Giro di Toscana
1956
Giro d'Itala:
Winner stage 8
Tour de France:
Winner stage 3
1958
Tour de France:
Winner stage 11
1959
Giro d'Itala:
Winner stage 17
1960
Giro d'Itala:
Winner stage 21

External links 

Official Tour de France results for Arigo Padovan

Italian male cyclists
1927 births
Possibly living people
Italian Tour de France stage winners
Italian Giro d'Italia stage winners
Cyclists from the Province of Padua
Tour de Suisse stage winners